Helpmejack Creek is a stream in Yukon–Koyukuk Census Area, Alaska, in the United States. It is a tributary of the Alatna River.

History
The name Helpmejack recalls the plea for help of someone who was stuck in the creek. A member of the United States Geological Survey officially recorded the old prospectors' name in 1902.

See also
List of rivers of Alaska

References

Rivers of Yukon–Koyukuk Census Area, Alaska
Rivers of Alaska
Rivers of Unorganized Borough, Alaska